The R305 is a Regional Route in South Africa that runs from coastal Stilbaai in the south north to the N2: approximately 10 km from Riversdale and 25 km from Albertinia.

References

External links
 Routes Travel Info

Regional Routes in the Western Cape